Simon Morris may refer to:

 Simon Morris (businessman), British businessman
 Simon Morris (politician), Irish-born politician in Newfoundland
 Simon Conway Morris, English palaeontologist